Farid Matuk is an American poet and educator, born to a Peruvian father and Syrian mother in Peru. He writes in both English and Spanish, and his Spanish translations have appeared in Kadar Koli, Translation Review, Mandorla, and Bombay Gin. His poems have appeared in Denver Quarterly, Flag + Void, Iowa Review, and Poetry and abroad in White Wall Review (Canada), Critical Quarterly (UK), and Poem: International English Language Quarterly (UK). He is currently Associate Professor of English and Creative Writing at the University of Arizona. His book This Isa Nice Neighborhood (Letter Machine, 2010) was the recipient of an Honorable Mention in the 2011 Arab American Book Awards. and was included in The Poetry Society of America's New American Poets series. My Daughter La Chola (Ahsata, 2013) received an Honorable Mention in the 2014 Arab American Book Awards. My Daughter La Chola was also named among the best books of 2013 by The Volta and by The Poetry Foundation while selections from its pages have been anthologized in The Best American Experimental Poetry, 2014, The &Now Awards: The Best Innovative Writing Vol. 3, and in Angels of the Americlypse: An Anthology of New Latino@ Writing. He serves as poetry editor for Fence and on the editorial board for the Creative Writing Studies book series at Bloomsbury. Matuk is the recipient of both the Ford Fellowship and Fulbright Fellowship. The University of Arizona Press published his second full-length collection, The Real Horse, in 2018.

Bibliography 
Matuk, Farid (2006). Is It The King? Austin: Effing Press.

Matuk, Farid (2010). Riverside. Green River, Vt.: Longhouse.

Matuk, Farid (2010). This Isa Nice Neighborhood. Chicago: Letter Machine Editions.

Matuk, Farid (2013). My Daughter La Chola. Boise: Ahsahta Press.

Matuk, Farid (2018). The Real Horse. Tucson: The University of Arizona Press.

References 

Peruvian emigrants to the United States
American people of Syrian descent
21st-century American poets
Living people
American male poets
Place of birth missing (living people)
Year of birth missing (living people)
Spanish-language poets
American Spanish-language poets
American Spanish-language writers
21st-century American male writers